The Guarani Aquifer, located beneath the surface of Argentina, Brazil, Paraguay, and Uruguay, is the second largest known aquifer system in the world and is an important source of fresh water. It is said that this vast underground reservoir could supply fresh drinking water to the world for 200 years. However, at closer inspection, if the world population were to stay at an equilibrium of about 6.96 billion, not even taking into account that babies need less water than grown adults, this figure reaches 1600 years, allowing about 9 liters per day per person. Due to an expected shortage of fresh water on a global scale, which environmentalists suggest will become critical in under 20 years, this important natural resource is rapidly becoming politicised, and its control becomes ever more controversial.

Geology of the aquifer 

The Guarani Aquifer consists primarily of fluvial sandstones of the Piramboia Formation and aeolian sandstones of the Botucatu Formation, which were deposited during the Triassic and Jurassic periods. Over 90% of the total area is overlain by early Cretaceous basalts of the Serra Geral Formation. The basalt's low permeability allows it to act as an aquitard, providing a high degree of containment. This greatly reduces the rate of infiltration and subsequent recharge, but also isolates the aquifer from the vadose zone, subsequent surface-associated losses due to evaporation and evapotranspiration, and potential contamination.

The erosion exposes pieces of sandstone on aquifer's banks, which are called outcrops. This is where the rain comes in and also where the contamination might happen. In general, the aquifer comprises a variety of quartz sand, well-rounded format, and has low clay content.

Research and monitoring of the aquifer in order to better manage it as a resource is considered important, as the population growth rate within its area is relatively high — resulting in higher consumption and pollution risks.

The countries over the aquifer are also the original four Mercosur countries.

Recharge of the aquifer 

The recharge distribution is related to precipitation rate. Its complexity is due to the indirect relation between them. The infiltration rate depends on parameters that are variables in time and space. Another important factor that contributes to the aquifer's recharge is the importance of evapotranspiration. The soil, plants and atmosphere could be considered as components of a system physically related and dynamic. In some regions, the quantity of water that evaporates is larger than the runoff flow.

A study by Brazilian Agricultural Research Corporation (Embrapa) in Ribeirão Preto - Brazil, from 1994 to 2001 indicates that agricultural activity using chemical products offers risk of contamination for the groundwater.

Vegetal interception is another factor that directly influences the quantity of water that infiltrates into the soil, according to Soares and Almeida (2001) who realized a study in the Eucalyptus area between October 1995 and September 1996. The interception during this period was evaluated in 11% of the precipitation value.

See also
Aquifer
Fossil water
Groundwater
Ogallala Aquifer

References

External links 

 Official Site for the book about the Aquifer, by Nadia Rita Boscardin Borghetti, José Roberto Borghetti and Ernani Francisco da Rosa Filho (in Brazilian Portuguese)
 Conference «The Management of the Guarani Aquifer System: An Example of Cooperation»

Aquifers of South America
Geography of South America
Aquifers
Aquifers in Brazil
Springs of Argentina
Springs of Brazil
Springs of Paraguay
Springs of Uruguay